Daniel René Claude Sangouma (born 7 February 1965 in Saint-Denis, Réunion) is a retired French sprinter who specialized in the 100 and 200 metres.

Biography
At the 1988 Summer Olympics in Seoul, he won a bronze medal in the 4x100 metres relay with his teammates Bruno Marie-Rose, Gilles Quenehervé and Max Morinière.

At the 1990 European Championships in Split the French team of Morinière, Sangouma, Jean-Charles Trouabal and Marie-Rose improved the world record to 37.79 seconds. The record stood less than one year, as the Santa Monica Track Club from the United States team ran in 37.67 seconds at the Weltklasse Zurich meet. With 10.02 seconds Sangouma is also a former French record holder in the 100 metres.

International competitions

References

External links

1965 births
Living people
Sportspeople from Saint-Denis, Réunion
French male sprinters
Athletes (track and field) at the 1988 Summer Olympics
Athletes (track and field) at the 1992 Summer Olympics
Olympic athletes of France
Olympic bronze medalists for France
Athletes from Réunion
World Athletics Championships medalists
European Athletics Championships medalists
World Athletics Championships athletes for France
Medalists at the 1988 Summer Olympics
Olympic bronze medalists in athletics (track and field)
Mediterranean Games gold medalists for France
Mediterranean Games bronze medalists for France
Mediterranean Games medalists in athletics
Athletes (track and field) at the 1993 Mediterranean Games